Ouagadougou (formerly Kadiogo Department) is a department or commune of Kadiogo Province in central Burkina Faso.

Towns and villages
The department's capital is the town of Ouagadougou.

References

Departments of Burkina Faso
Kadiogo Province